Nadeesha Gayanthi Murukkuwadura (born 6 September 1984) is a Sri Lankan badminton player. She was included in the national badminton team in 2006 and got the opportunity to represent Sri Lanka at the 2006 Asian Games competing in the women's singles and women's doubles events.

Nadeesha Gayanthi also participated at the 2007 BWF World Championships representing Sri Lanka and competed in the women's doubles category pairing with Thilini Jayasinghe despite being knocked out of the first round. In 2008, she partnered Chandrika de Silva and emerged victorious in the women's doubles as a part of the Sri Lankan National Badminton Championships. Nadeesha Gayanthi also appeared for Sri Lanka at the 2014 Commonwealth Games by competing in the singles and doubles events.

Achievements

South Asian Games 
Women's doubles

References

External links 
 

1984 births
Living people
People from Southern Province, Sri Lanka
Sri Lankan female badminton players
Badminton players at the 2006 Asian Games
Asian Games competitors for Sri Lanka
Badminton players at the 2014 Commonwealth Games
Commonwealth Games competitors for Sri Lanka
South Asian Games silver medalists for Sri Lanka
South Asian Games bronze medalists for Sri Lanka
South Asian Games medalists in badminton